The Stereaceae are a family of corticioid fungi in the Russulales order. Species in the family have a widespread distribution, are lignicolous or terrestrial (in leaf litter), and typically saprobic. According to the Dictionary of the Fungi, the family contains 22 genera and 125 species.

Genera list
Acanthobasidium
Acanthofungus
Acanthophysium
Aleurocystis
Aleurodiscus
Amylofungus
Amylohyphus
Amylosporomyces
Amylostereum
Boidinia
Chaetoderma
Conferticium
Gloeocystidiopsis
Gloeodontia
Gloeomyces 
Megalocystidium
Pseudoxenasma
Scotoderma
Scytinostromella
Stereum
Xylobolus

There is also phylogenetic evidence that the species known as BY1 is in Stereaceae, but has yet to be described completely.

References

External links
 Stereaceae at Hidden Forest

 
Russulales
Basidiomycota families